State Route 137 (SR 137) is a  state highway that serves as a north–south connection between the Florida state line near Wing and Andalusia. It travels through the southwestern part of Covington County. SR 137 serves as a continuation of Florida State Road 189 (SR 189) upon crossing into Alabama at its southern terminus and ends at US 29 southwest of Carolina.

Route description
SR 137 begins at the Florida state line where SR 189 transitions to SR 137 south of Wing. From this point, SR 137 follows a northerly course through the Conecuh National Forest en route to its northern terminus at US 29 (internally designated as SR 15) southwest of Carolina.

Major intersections

See also

References

137
Transportation in Covington County, Alabama